Horus Engels (1914–1991), German painter
Richard Engels, American politician, state representative in South Dakota
Rick Engles (born 1954), professional American football player

See also
Richard Engel (disambiguation)